Georges Ripert (22 April 1880 – 4 July 1958) was a lawyer who was briefly Secretary of State for Public Instruction and Youth in the Vichy Regime.

Early career

Ripert received his agrégation in 1906 from the Faculty of Law of Aix.
He taught Mercantile and Marine law at Aix.
In 1919 he was called to Paris as a substitute for Marcel Planiol.
Ripert undertook the revision of the Traité pratique de droit civil français by Marcel Planiol, which became a work edited by Ripert but with several authors.
The 3-volume Traité élémentaire de droit civil by Planiol et Ripert was rewritten by Ripert and Jean Boulanger.
The Traité de droit commercial was written by Ripert, then by Ripert and René Roblot.
Other works were the Traité de droit maritime and essays such as La règle morale dans les obligations civile (1926) and Le régime démocratique et le droit civil moderne (1936).
As Dean of the Faculty of Law of Paris he welcomed Jews in the name of Christianity.

World War II (1939–44)

On 6 September 1940 Ripert was named Secretary of State for Public Instruction and Youth, replacing Émile Mireaux.
As Minister of Public Instruction until December 1940 he contributed to elaborating the first Jewish Statute which excluded Jews from universities as students or teachers, and dismissed the Jewish professors, including his pre-war friend René Cassin.
On 13 December 1940 Marshall Philippe Pétain asked all the ministers to sign a collective letter of resignation during a full cabinet meeting. 
Pierre Laval, then Minister of Justice, thought it was a device to get rid of René Belin, the Minister of Labor. 
However, the Marshal accepted the resignations of Laval and Ripert.
Ripert returned to his position as Dean of the Faculty of Law of Paris.
He remained a member of the National Council of Vichy throughout the war.
He invited students to study National Socialist law objectively.

Later career (1944–58)

After the Liberation of France Ripert was arrested on 16 November 1944 and imprisoned until 14 February 1945.
In 1947 the High Court of Justice dismissed his case for "acts of resistance", but no records of the trial were kept.
Ripert was reinstated at the university and Institute.
Ripert was Honorary Professor at the Faculty of Law in Paris until 1958.
He remained conservative, and his Déclin du droit (1949) strongly criticized the post-war juridical situation.
His Les Forces créatrices du droit (1955) also criticized the changes to civil law introduced by new French republic.
Ripert died suddenly in the morning of 4 July 1958 while correcting the proofs of the 3rd edition of his Traite- de droit commercial.
For his rigorous and elegantly written works Philippe Malaurie calls Ripert the greatest jurist of the 20th century.

Publications

Notes

Sources

1880 births
1958 deaths
20th-century French lawyers
French Ministers of National Education